Flight 704 may refer to:

Mexicana Flight 704, crashed on 4 June 1969
Icelandair Flugfélag Islands Flight 704, crashed on 26 September 1970

0704